The 1941 season was the 12th completed season of Finnish Football League Championship, known as the Mestaruussarja.

Overview

The 1941 Mestaruussarja  was contested by 8 teams, with TPS Turku winning the championship. HT Helsinki and HPS Helsinki were relegated to the second tier which was known as the Suomensarja.

League table

The league was abandoned due to World War II (14 rounds having been scheduled). The above table was declared final.

Sudet Viipuri played their home matches in Helsinki.

Results

Footnotes

References

Mestaruussarja seasons
Fin
Fin
Mestaruussarja